Leesta Vall Sound Recordings, or simply Leesta Vall, is an independent record label based in Brooklyn, NY. They specialize in limited runs of direct-to-vinyl 7" singles, each of which captures a unique take.

Background
Leesta Vall was founded by musician Aaron Zimmer in 2012 as a booking agency. They discontinued the agency side of the business and since 2017 have focused exclusively on recording direct-to-vinyl releases that capture live performances. Each individual performance is lathe-cut directly to a 7" vinyl record using modified antique equipment from the 1950s.

Artists
Artists have included Sondre Lerche, Wakey Wakey (band), Pat McGee, Matthew Mayfield, Tony Lucca, Gabe Dixon, Chris Ayer, and Phoebe Hunt (former member of The Belleville Outfit). While artists may apply to record at Leesta Vall, Zimmer describes the roster as "pretty selective".

References

See also
 List of record labels

American record labels
Record labels established in 2017
American independent record labels